Ritchie Rock is the conspicuous rock off the southwest coast of Snow Island in the South Shetland Islands, Antarctica extending 80 m in south-north direction and 73 m in west-east direction, with a surface area of 0.17 ha. The vicinity was visited by early 19th century sealers.

The feature is named after Edward Samuel Ritchie (1814-1895), an American inventor and physicist who created a waterborne version of the theodolite used in harbour surveys; in association with other names in the area deriving from the early development or use of geodetic instruments and methods.

Location
Bulgarian mapping in 2009.

See also
 List of Antarctic and subantarctic islands

Maps
 South Shetland Islands. Scale 1:200000 topographic map. DOS 610 Sheet W 62 60. Tolworth, UK, 1968
 L. Ivanov. Antarctica: Livingston Island and Greenwich, Robert, Snow and Smith Islands. Scale 1:120000 topographic map. Troyan: Manfred Wörner Foundation, 2010.  (First edition 2009. )
 Antarctic Digital Database (ADD). Scale 1:250000 topographic map of Antarctica. Scientific Committee on Antarctic Research (SCAR). Since 1993, regularly upgraded and updated

Notes

References
 Bulgarian Antarctic Gazetteer. Antarctic Place-names Commission. (details in Bulgarian, basic data in English)

External links
 Ritchie Rock. Adjusted Copernix satellite image

Snow Island (South Shetland Islands)
Rock formations of the South Shetland Islands
Bulgaria and the Antarctic